Governor Election in Sevastopol were held on 10 September 2017. It was the second election of the Governor of Sevastopol after the 2014 Russian annexation of Crimea, and was the first direct elections for Governor (last time the Governor was elected to the Legislative Assembly).

Background
The previous Governor of Sevastopol Sergey Menyailo, who was appointed after the 2014 Russian annexation of Crimea, in the summer of 2016 was appointed representative of Russian President to the Siberian Federal District. The acting Governor was appointed Dmitry Ovsyannikov.

March 14, 2017, the Legislative Assembly of Sevastopol adopted the law on the introduction of direct elections of the Governor.

Candidates
Candidates on the ballot:

Opinion polls

Result

Voter turnout (in the) election was 34%.

See also
2017 Russian gubernatorial elections

Notes

References

2017 elections in Russia
2017